The  Little League World Series took place between August 25 and August 29 in Williamsport, Pennsylvania. The American Little League of Wayne, New Jersey, defeated the Campbell Little League of Campbell, California, in the championship game of the 24th Little League World Series.

Teams

Winners Bracket

Consolation Bracket

External links
1970 Little League World Series
Line scores for the 1970 LLWS

Little League World Series
Little League World Series
Little League World Series

Ben Hayes Weisbaden Little League Germany - Played in MLB with the Cincinnati Reds and currently President of the New York-Penn League